The commercial name OctetString refers to the former software firm based in Schaumburg, Illinois, that published OctetString Virtual Directory (VDE), a LDAP based virtual directory product focused on the identity management segment of the security software market.

The company was founded in 2000 by Clayton Donley and Nathan Owen, two consultants who left IBM to start the company.  On November 16, 2005, the company was acquired by Oracle Corporation.

References

External links 
Official Website of Oracle Virtual Directory

Oracle acquisitions
Companies based in Cook County, Illinois
Schaumburg, Illinois
Defunct software companies of the United States